K. T. Jaleel (born 30 May 1967) is an Indian politician from Kerala and a Member of Legislative Assembly (MLA) from Thavanur and has served as Minister of Higher Education, Welfare of Minorities, Waqf and Hajj in the Left Democratic Front (LDF) -led ministry. He was first elected to Kerala Legislative Assembly in 2006. He was an Associate Professor of History at P. S. M. O. College, Tirurangadi.
He previously served as Minister of Local Administration, Government of Kerala.

Education

He completed his Primary education from GUPS-Painkanur, Valanchery and AUPS Velimukku. His secondary education was from Government Higher secondary  School, Kuttippuram. He did his pre-degree from Islahiya College, Chenamangalur, and his Graduation and Post-graduation from Pocker Sahib Memorial Orphanage College (PSMO College), Tirurangadi. He owns an M.Phil-degree from University of Calicut and Ph.D. from Kerala University, Thiruvananthapuram for the topic "Role of Variyamkunnath Kunjahammed Haji and Ali Musliyar in the Malabar Rebellion of 1921". He is currently Associate Professor in History, in Pocker Sahib Memorial Orphanage College (PSMO) College, Tirurangadi and settled at Valanchery.

Political life 

He was a follower of the Students' Islamic Movement of India, leader as a student and a chairman, then  joined the Muslim Students Federation, the students’ wing of the Indian Union Muslim League. He was ousted from the youth wing of IUML following differences with the leadership. Afterwards he contested independently with LDF support.

He was elected as an MLA for the first time in 2006, from Kuttippuram constituency as LDF supported Independent candidate, defeating the then IUML General Secretary P. K. Kunhalikutty. In 2011 he was elected from Thavanoor constituency, defeating V. V. Prakash of Indian National Congress by a margin of 6,854 votes. In 2016 he was reelected from Thavanoor, with a majority of 17,064, against P. Ifthiquarudheen of Indian National Congress.

Jaleel had come under fire after being accused of nepotism by P.K. Firos of Indian Union Muslim League over the appointment of his cousin as the general manager of Kerala State Minorities Development Finance Corporation (KSMDFC). Kerala High Court had dismissed the plea regarding the same on July 11, 2019 and criticised the political agendas behind the petition by Firos. Jaleel was accused of links to the 2020 Kerala gold smuggling case and was questioned by Enforcement Directorate (ED) and the National Investigation Agency (NIA). He denied any involvement, saying that the contact with one of the accused Swapna was regarding a charity work as suggested by the Consulate General of UAE.

K T Jaleel resigned four days after a state anti-corruption ombudsman declared him to be guilty of “favouritism and nepotism”.
K T Jaleel was elected from the constituency Thavanoor in Malapuram defeating Firos Kunamparambil a charity worker with a vote margin of 2,564 Votes  in 2021 Kerala Assembly Election.

Positions held
He held positions such as: Chairman,  P.S. M.O. College Union; he served as MSF chairman in his education period, Malappuram District Council; 
Director, Kerala Automobiles Ltd and Malcotex,  Karthala Chungam; 
General Secretary, Kerala State Muslim Youth League; 
Chairman, Standing Committee on Education and Health, District Panchayat Malappuram; 
Syndicate member, Calicut University;
Director of Norka Roots;

Controversies

In 2019, KT Jaleel had to resign from the Pinarayi cabinet after the Kerala Lokayukta found him guilty of nepotism and that he had ‘misused’ his official powers to appoint a family member in Kerala State Minorities Development Finance Corporation In 2018, Jaleel had appointed his close relative KT Adeeb as General Manager of the KSMDFC, under the Ministry of Minority Welfare in Kerala.

In 2020 there was an investigation of the illegal import of dates and religious texts through Diplomatic courier mailed to the UAE Consulate. These emerged during a probe into the smuggling of 30 kg of gold through diplomatic cargo to the Consulate.
The National Investigation Agency (NIA) called Jaleel as a witness in the Gold smuggling case, which has listed him as the 114th witness, had recorded his statements on September 17, 2020. KT Jaleel's Kashmir-related Facebook post also led to controversy.

References

1967 births
Living people
Muslim League
People from Malappuram district
Kerala MLAs 2006–2011
Kerala MLAs 2016–2021
Kerala MLAs 2011–2016